Elysius itaunensis is a moth of the family Erebidae. It was described by Alfredo Rei do Régo Barros in 1971. It is found in Brazil.

References

itaunensis
Moths described in 1971
Moths of South America